The culture of Texas is often considered one of the major cultures influencing the greater American culture. Texas is one of the most populous and populated American states in its urban centers and has seen tremendous waves of migration out of the American North and West in contrast to its eastern neighbors in the Deep South. But it retains the regionalisms and distinct cultural identities of German Texan, Tejanos, Cajuns, Irish, African American, and White Southern enclaves established before the republic era and admission to statehood.

Texans will tend to acknowledge the five major regions, East Texas, Central Texas, North Texas, South Texas, and West Texas as regions within the state defined by urban centers and differing cultural norms. The Texas Triangle, anchored by Houston, Dallas-Fort Worth, and San Antonio, is an interstate corridor between the three major Texan cities closest to the geographic center, that anchor three different cultural regions of the state.

It is a border between the western prairies, the Deep South, and Mexico, influenced by Hispanic, African, and Anglo traditions. It is a place of island communities from Germany, Czechoslovakia, Poland, Mexico, southern African American and White Southern populations, and historic tribes of Native Americans. Its culture is a complex blending and separation of the cultures different people originally brought with them to Texas. Its African American community contributed to the blues through various artists, and it is the only place in the world where its past musicians such as Adolph Hofner sang Western Swing Style music in Czech and German. It is larger in size than most European nations. Its geography, climate, people, neighboring regions, and size make it far too diverse to be classified in any other way than one truly of its own. Texas is placed in the Southern United States by the United States Census Bureau.

Agriculture

Ranch and cowboy culture 

Texas has a strong ranching tradition which has had significant influence on American cowboy culture, particularly in rodeo. Texas has made a strong mark on national and international pop culture. The entire state is strongly associated with the image of the cowboy shown in westerns and in country western music. The state's numerous oil tycoons are also a popular pop culture topic as seen in the hit TV series Dallas.

Rodeo 

Rodeo is the official sport of Texas. The annual Houston Livestock Show and Rodeo is the world's largest known rodeo. It is held over 20 days from late February through early March. The event begins with trail rides that originate from several points throughout the state, all of which convene at Reliant Park for a barbecue cook-off. The rodeo includes typical rodeo events, as well as concert performances from major artists and carnival rides. The Fort Worth Livestock Show and Rodeo last three weeks in late January and early February. It has many traditional rodeos, but also a cowboy rodeo, and a Mexican rodeo in recent years that both have large fan bases.

State Fair 

The big State Fair of Texas, one of the largest state fairs in the United States by attendance, is held in Dallas each year between late September through mid- to late October at Fair Park. Two noteworthy college football games, the Red River Rivalry between the University of Oklahoma Sooners and the University of Texas Longhorns, and the State Fair Classic between the Grambling State University Tigers and the Prairie View A&M University Panthers are played at the Cotton Bowl in Fair Park during the State Fair.  The State Fair is known for its fried food, particularly the corn dogs. The State Fair is also home to the Texas Star, the tallest Ferris wheel in the Western Hemisphere, and Big Tex, a  cowboy statue.

Other state fairs held in Texas include the North Texas State Fair in Denton, the South Texas State Fair in Beaumont, and the East Texas State Fair in Tyler.

History 

The history of Texas, particularly of the old independent Republic of Texas, is intimately bound up with its present culture. Frontier Texas! is a museum of the American Old West in Abilene. The Texas Historical Commission is an agency dedicated to historic preservation within the state of Texas. The Texas State Historical Association publishes an encyclopedia on Texas history, geography, and culture called the Handbook of Texas.

In Norway, "texas" is used as slang for something chaotic and uncontrolled, as influenced from popular Norwegian depictions of cowboy culture and Western literature associated with Texas. "Der var helt texas! (That was !)" has mostly pejorative connotations but can also refer to a party out of control or a runaway success.

Folklore of Texas 

Texas has a considerable independent body of folklore, primarily in connection with its historical ranching and cowboy cultures, the American Old West, and the Texas War of Independence. The Texas Folklore Society is the second-oldest folklore organization continually functioning in the United States. Many well-known figures and stories in American folklore are associated with Texas:
 Pecos Bill, the fictional American cowboy
 Davy Crockett, 19th-century American folk hero, frontiersman, soldier and politician who served in the Texas Revolution and died at the Battle of the Alamo.
 Ottine Swamp Thing, the urban legend of a bigfoot-like swamp monster in Ottine, Texas.

State holidays 
Texas has several recognized state holidays, including:
 Texas Independence Day
 Lyndon Baines Johnson Day
 San Jacinto Day
 Juneteenth
 Confederate Heroes Day (partial staffing day)

Art

Architecture

Music 
The Lone Star State has helped popularize this musical style throughout the world and made the Texas cowboy an international icon that would forever be identified with country music. Although many people may think of country music when they think of the Lone Star State, Texas actually encompasses a wide variety of ethnic musical genres and regional styles.

Texas has a vibrant live music scene in Austin boasting more music venues per capita than any other U.S. city, befitting the city's official slogan as The Live Music Capital of the World. Austin's music revolves around the many nightclubs on 6th Street and an annual film, music, and multimedia festival known as South by Southwest. The longest-running concert music program on American television, Austin City Limits, was videotaped at the University of Texas at Austin campus. Austin City Limits and Waterloo Records run the Austin City Limits Music Festival, an annual music and art festival held at Zilker Park in Austin.

In Houston, the annual Free Press Summer Fest is a major draw as well as the entertainment lineups at the annual Houston Livestock Show and Rodeo.  Notable music venues for Houston are Fitzgerald's, Warehouse Live, and Walter's among others.  Many renowned musicians' origins are in Houston including Lyle Lovett, Beyoncé, Clint Black, The Crusaders, Lightnin' Hopkins, and Kenny Rogers as well as groups including D.R.I., Helstar, La Mafia, the Geto Boys, and ZZ Top.  The Houston Symphony and Houston Grand Opera are both attractions of the Houston Theater District.

Literature

Japanese anime

Texas two major cities, Dallas and Houston, currently houses two major Japanese anime production companies: Funimation and Sentai Filmworks, which dubs the popular series in the English language voiced by several actors throughout the state such as John Swasey, Chris Sabat, Colleen Clinkenbeard, Brittney Karbowski, David Matranga and many others. Many annual anime conventions are also held in the state.

Sports 

Texas is well known for its love of football at all levels. Watching football is a dominant leisure activity across the state, and autumn weekends are filled with high school games on Friday nights, NCAA and other college games on Saturdays (Texas' 12 top-level or "FBS" schools are more than any other state), and the NFL's Dallas Cowboys and Houston Texans on Sundays. Texas high school football fans are famously passionate, and the various teams often become the obsessive pride of the towns they represent. This phenomenon was documented in the 1990 book Friday Night Lights: A Town, a Team, and a Dream and its popular film and television adaptations. School districts in Texas are sometimes criticized for the amount of money spent on their sports programs and facilities; for example, the Allen Independent School District spent $60 million to open Eagle Stadium in 2012, only to see it closed in 2014 due to serious structural problems. However, this spending is often driven by local residents—the Allen stadium was built using funds from a publicly approved bond issue.

Baseball is also very popular in Texas. In Major League Baseball, the Texas Rangers and Houston Astros claim followers across roughly equal territories, as North Texas, West Texas, and Panhandle residents are largely Rangers fans, while Southeast Texas, Central Texas, and South Texas are predominantly inhabited by Astros fans. Minor league baseball is also well-attended, with two teams in the Triple-A Pacific Coast League and four in the Double-A Texas League.

Other popular sports in Texas include golf (which can be played year-round because of the South's humid climate), basketball (the state's three NBA teams, the Houston Rockets, San Antonio Spurs, and Dallas Mavericks, have all won league titles), fishing, and auto racing, particularly at the Texas Motor Speedway in Fort Worth. Lacrosse, originally played by some of the indigenous tribes, is a visible sport and growing. Soccer is a popular participatory sport—especially among children—but as a spectator sport, it does not yet have a large following despite two Texan teams in Major League Soccer. Ice hockey has been a growing participatory sport in the Dallas/Fort Worth area since the Minnesota North Stars became the Dallas Stars in 1993.  Minor league professional hockey has since grown and is also home to the San Antonio Rampage and Texas Stars of the American Hockey League and the Allen Americans of the ECHL. Texas was home to many Central Hockey League and Western Professional Hockey League teams prior to the leagues' dissolution. Some of the organizations involved with the former leagues launched junior ice hockey teams in the North American Hockey League and the league headquarters were moved to Frisco.

Rodeo is the official sport of Texas; see § Rodeo for more information.

Media 

Media devoted to Texas culture include Texas Monthly, a monthly magazine headquartered in Austin that takes as its premise the idea that Texas began as a distinctive place and remains so. It publishes articles on all things culturally Texan, with past pieces on such topics as Texas politicians, the Texas Rangers, Texas cuisine, and true crime incidents in Texas. In 2013, the magazine established a food writing position entirely devoted to barbecue.

Cuisine 

Important aspects of Texas cuisine include Texas barbecue and the local fusion of Southern, Mexican, American, and Southwestern cuisines called Tex-Mex cuisine.

Other 
The Texas Folklife Festival is an annual event sponsored by the University of Texas at San Antonio's Institute of Texan Cultures celebrating the many ethnicities represented in the population of the state of Texas. Thousands attend the three-day event each year, which features food, crafts, music, and dances from ethnic groups that immigrated to Texas.

A 2015 report by non-profit organization Mission:  Readiness found that 73% of military-aged youth in Texas were physically ineligible for military service due to issues with obesity and ill-health, a rate much higher than the national average.

See also

 Institute of Texan Cultures
 List of people from Texas
 List of Texas state symbols
 Languages of Texas, including Texas German
 Texas Institute of Letters

References

 
Texas